Legęzów  is a village in the administrative district of Gmina Zakrzew, within Radom County, Masovian Voivodeship, in east-central Poland. It is located in the time zone Central European Summer Time. Data on the UTC standard, universal coordinated time. Its closest airport is Warsaw Chopin Airport.

References

Villages in Radom County